The 1930 South Dakota gubernatorial election was held on November 4, 1930. Incumbent Democratic Governor William J. Bulow declined to run for re-election to a third term, instead opting to successfully run for the U.S. Senate. The Republican nomination was hard-fought and the primary was crowded; because no candidate received 35% of the vote, state law required that the nomination be decided at a state party convention. There, former State Senator Warren Green, the last-place finisher in the primary, defeated Secretary of State Gladys Pyle, the plurality winner. In the general election, Green faced D. A. McCullough, the state's Rural Credits Commissioner and the Democratic nominee. Despite Bulow's success in the preceding two elections, Green defeated McCullough by a decisive margin—even as Bulow himself was elected to the U.S. Senate.

Democratic Primary

Candidates
 D. A. McCullough, State Rural Credits Commissioner
 Lorenzo E. Corey, State Representative from Charles Mix County

Results

Republican Primary

Candidates
 Gladys Pyle, Secretary of State of South Dakota
 Carl Gunderson, former Governor of South Dakota
 Brooke Howell, State Senator from Brown County
 Carl O. Trygstad, State Senator from Brookings County
 Warren Green, former State Senator from Hamlin County, former member of the State Board of Charities and Corrections

Campaign
Following Governor Bulow's decision to run for the U.S. Senate rather than seek re-election, a crowded Republican primary developed to succeed him. When the votes were cast, Secretary of State Gladys Pyle emerged as the narrow plurality winner, but because she received less than 35% of the vote, under state law, the primary winner would be decided by a state party convention. 

Pyle, as the first-place finisher in the primary, was seen by some observers as a frontrunner heading into the convention. The Huronite argued, "If the [R]epublican state convention nominates Gladys Pyle for governor, she will be elected. . . . And she would make a most excellent governor." In an editorial, the Argus Leader urged the convention to nominate her: "The smart thing for the Republican Party to do at its convention in Pierre on May 20 is to nominate Miss Gladys Pyle for Governor." But this praise was frequently backhanded; though the Argus Leader endorsed her candidacy, it also noted that "[t]he convention promises to be a colorful affair with the added novelty a woman candidate" and that "Miss Pyle's great strength is that the women voted for her. In other words, it was another manifestation of the eternal battle  of the sexes. Every husband knows about it."

At the convention, following twelve ballots, Green, the last-place finisher in the primary, was nominated over Pyle. Green was finally put over the edge as the consensus choice when Howell dropped out and urged his supporters to back Green. Pyle had led most of the twelve ballots, but was unable to win enough support to receive majority support. In defeat, however, Pyle was offered the vice-chairmanship of the state party, which she declined, noting that it would be impossible for her to continue her service as Secretary of State and serve in a party leadership role.

Results

General election

Results

References

South Dakota
1930
Gubernatorial
November 1930 events